Perry James Jones III (born September 24, 1991) is an American professional basketball player for the TaiwanBeer HeroBears of the T1 League. He played college basketball for Baylor.

High school career
He was the #7 player in the ESPNU 100, the #9 player in the class of 2010 by Scout.com, and also rated as the #9 player by Rivals.com. In his junior year, Jones, along with future Texas forward Shawn Williams, led Duncanville to the Texas 5A championship game where they lost to Cedar Hill High School 59–51. Duncanville finished with a 23-9 record for the season.

In recognition of his outstanding career, Jones was named to the 2010 McDonald's All-American team.

AAU
Jones' AAU team was the  LBA Seawolves. In July 2009, he helped lead them to the semifinals in the Star Vision Sports Center Stage tournament in Las Vegas.

College recruitment

|}

Jones committed to Baylor on April 17, 2007, and started playing for them in the 2010–11 NCAA season. He was ranked as the #7 overall player on ESPN, the 9th ranked by Rivals, and the 14th ranked by Scout.com.

College career

Jones had 11 points and 8 rebounds in his Baylor debut.

Jones averaged 13.9 points, 7.2 rebounds, and 1.2 assists per game during his freshman season at Baylor. Despite the hype around the Baylor basketball program coming into the season, the Bears finished with a record of 18-13 (7-9 Big 12) and failed to make the NCAA Tournament. Despite Baylor's struggles Perry Jones was still named to the All-Big 12 Second Team along with Kansas junior Markieff Morris, Texas freshman Tristan Thompson, Iowa State senior Diante Garrett, and Texas A&M sophomore Khris Middleton.

On March 10, 2011, NCAA investigators ruled Perry Jones ineligible for receiving improper benefits from his AAU coach prior to enrolling at Baylor University (The benefits were reportedly three 15-day loans to Jones' parents totaling less than $1,000, all of which were paid back). Jones was forced to sit out of Baylor's game against Oklahoma in the Big 12 tournament, which the Bears lost by 17 eliminating their chances at an NCAA Tournament berth. Jones could return to Baylor next season on an athletic scholarship, but would have to sit out the first five games of the 2011–2012 season before he could be reinstated by the NCAA and eligible to play.

On April 11, 2011, Perry Jones announced that he would be returning to Baylor for his sophomore season.

College statistics

|-
|style="text-align:left;"|2010–11
|style="text-align:left;"|Baylor Bears
|30||30||33.9||.549||.200||.664||7.2||1.2||0.5||0.9||13.9
|-
|style="text-align:left;"|2011–12
|style="text-align:left;"|Baylor Bears
|33||33||30.7||.500||.303||.696||7.6||1.3||0.8||0.6||13.5
|}

Professional career

Oklahoma City Thunder (2012–2015)
Jones was a projected lottery pick in the 2012 NBA draft, but fell to 28th overall when he was selected by the Oklahoma City Thunder. During his rookie season, he had multiple assignments with the Tulsa 66ers of the NBA Development League.

After receiving limited opportunities with the Thunder in 2012–13, Jones went on to play 62 games in 2013–14 with averages of 3.5 points and 1.8 rebounds per game. On November 24, 2013, he scored a season-high 13 points in the 95-73 win over the Utah Jazz. Jones also appeared in 11 playoff games during the 2014 NBA Playoffs, scoring a playoff-high of 8 points in Game 1 of the Thunder's semi-final match-up against the Los Angeles Clippers.

On October 30, 2014, Jones scored a career-high 32 points on 10-of-17 shooting in the 90-93 loss to the Los Angeles Clippers.

Iowa Energy (2015–2016)
On July 14, 2015, Jones was traded, along with a 2019 second round pick and cash considerations, to the Boston Celtics in exchange for a conditional 2018 second-round pick that would be completely unprotected for 2019. The deal generated a traded player exception for the Thunder. On October 24, he was waived by the Celtics after appearing in five preseason games. On October 31, he was selected by the Iowa Energy with the third overall pick in the 2015 NBA Development League draft. On March 23, 2016, he was waived by Iowa.

Khimki Moscow (2016)
On August 9, 2016, Jones signed with Khimki Moscow Region of Russia for the 2016–17 season. On October 11, 2016, he parted ways with Khimki after appearing in only one game.

Return to Iowa (2016)
On November 15, 2016, Jones was re-acquired by the Iowa Energy.

Bursaspor (2019–2021)
On August 28, 2019, he has signed with Bursaspor of the Turkish Super League.

s.Oliver Würzburg (2021)
On January 29, 2021, s.Oliver Würzburg of the Basketball Bundesliga (BBL) announced the signing of Jones.

Windy City Bulls (2022)
On January 2, 2022, Jones cleared waivers and was acquired by the Windy City Bulls via the available player pool. He was then later waived by the Windy City Bulls on February 23, 2022.

Taipei Fubon Braves (2022–2023)
On April 3, 2022, Jones signed with the Taipei Fubon Braves of Taiwanese P. League+.

Taipei Fubon Braves (2023–present)
On January 6, 2023, Jones signed with the TaiwanBeer HeroBears of the T1 League.

NBA career statistics

Regular season

|-
| align="left" | 
| align="left" | Oklahoma City
| 38 || 1 || 7.4 || .394 || .000 || .667 || 1.6 || .3 || .1 || .2 || 2.3
|-
| align="left" | 
| align="left" | Oklahoma City
| 62 || 7 || 12.3 || .459 || .361 || .667 || 1.8 || .4 || .2 || .3 || 3.5
|-
| align="left" | 
| align="left" | Oklahoma City
| 43 || 13 || 14.7 || .397 || .233 || .649 || 1.8 || .4 || .4 || .2 || 4.3
|-
| align="center" colspan="2" | Career
| 143 || 21 || 11.7 || .420 || .293 || .660 || 1.8 || .4 || .3 || .2 || 3.4
|-

Playoffs

|-
| style="text-align:left;"| 2013
| style="text-align:left;"| Oklahoma City
| 1 || 0 || 5.0 || .000 || .000 || .000 || 1.0 || .0 || .0 || .0 || .0
|-
| style="text-align:left;"| 2014
| style="text-align:left;"| Oklahoma City
| 11 || 0 || 5.0 || .389 || .300 || .000 || .8 || .1 || .0 || .1 || 1.5
|- class="sortbottom"
| style="text-align:center;" colspan="2"| Career
| 12 || 0 || 5.0 || .368 || .300 || .000 || .8 || .1 || .0 || .1 || 1.4

References

External links

Baylor Bears bio
NBADraft.net Profile
Scout.com Profile
Rivals.com Profile

1991 births
Living people
21st-century African-American sportspeople
African-American basketball players
American men's 3x3 basketball players
American men's basketball players
American expatriate basketball people in Germany
American expatriate basketball people in Russia
American expatriate basketball people in Turkey
Basketball players from Louisiana
Basketball players from Texas
Baylor Bears men's basketball players
BC Khimki players
Big3 players
Bursaspor Basketbol players
Duncanville High School alumni
Iowa Energy players
Iowa Wolves players
McDonald's High School All-Americans
Oklahoma City Thunder draft picks
Oklahoma City Thunder players
Parade High School All-Americans (boys' basketball)
People from Duncanville, Texas
People from Winnsboro, Louisiana
Power forwards (basketball)
Small forwards
Tulsa 66ers players
Windy City Bulls players
Taipei Fubon Braves players
American expatriate basketball people in Taiwan
P. League+ imports
TaiwanBeer HeroBears players
T1 League imports